Kevin Corby may refer to:

 Kevin Corby (cricketer) (born 1959), English cricketer
 Kevin Corby (soccer) (born 1988), American soccer player
 Kevin Corby (politician) (1928–2006), Australian politician